

Champions

French Championships

French Open

Statistics

Multiple champions

Champions by country

If the doubles partners are from the same country then that country gets two titles instead of one, while if they are from different countries then each country will get one title apiece.

Notes

References

See also

French Open other competitions
List of French Open men's singles champions
List of French Open women's singles champions 
List of French Open women's doubles champions
List of French Open mixed doubles champions

Grand Slam men's doubles
List of Australian Open men's doubles champions
List of Wimbledon gentlemen's doubles champions
List of US Open men's doubles champions 
List of Grand Slam men's doubles champions

Mens
French Open
French Open